Speocolpodes is a genus of ground beetles in the family Carabidae. This genus has a single species, Speocolpodes franiai. It is found in Guatemala.

References

Platyninae